Sufra NW London is a community food and support hub based in Stonebridge ward in the London Borough of Brent. Their network of Food Banks and Community Kitchens across the London Borough of Brent act as gateway services that enable their beneficiaries to access a wider programme of activities designed to address the root causes of poverty and homelessness in the local area. Their wrap around support includes Welfare Advice, a Refugee Support Programme, an award-winning community food growing project - St. Raphael’s Edible Garden, and a range of AQA accredited training and employability courses. 

Sufra was founded by Mohammed Mamdani; its name comes from an Arabic term, sufra, associated with communal eating. It was officially founded in April, 2013 when the when the London Borough of Brent's council funded the charity in Raphael's Estate, one of the poorest estates in that area.

History

2011–2013: Initial Idea and Start up

In 2011, Sufra was proposed by Mohammed Mamdani, a social entrepreneur, who founded Muslim Youth Helpline and Ansar Youth Project and Al-Mizan Charitable Trust, Mamdani used his connections in Al-Mizan to initially fund and launch the Sufra project in 2012, until eventually it was officially founded in April, 2013. Sufra (pronounced Sof-rah) is an Arabic word for a tablecloth that is laid on the ground when serving a meal in various Middle Eastern and North African countries. The aim of the charity was to provide local people with food, basic necessities and toiletries.

In April 2013, Sufra relocated to St Raphael's Estate to alleviate the need for support, as this was one of the poorest estates in the local area. Since start of operations, Sufra has distributed food parcels to thousands of people in need. These beneficiaries have been referred to Sufra by over 150 local referral agencies.  Food collections had been successful with regular donations from key supermarkets and schools.

2014–2015: Food Academies and Welfare Surgeries

In June 2014, Sufra began to run Food Academies, teaching people to cook. The main aim was to train young people between the ages of 16–25 years in basic cookery skills. Over 5 weeks and 10 intensive sessions it taught people to cook 10 home-cooked meals, understand nutrition and how to maintain a healthy diet. In addition to this, they ran a master-chef competition and learned to manage weekly budgets with an accredited qualification, which can be used to apply for an apprenticeship or employment in the catering industry. Unfortunately, this course had to be put on hold due to Covid-19.  

In January 2015, Sufra joined a partnership with Aston Business School. It launched a recruitment drive for their first Business Enterprise Project which was sponsored by Segro. The project was aimed at young people between the ages of 16 and 25 with got a business idea to help them get it off the ground. The Business Enterprise Project included a free 5-day residential at Aston University’s Business School where candidates learned everything they needed to know about setting up their business, followed by personal mentoring, a grant of £500 and free office space. 

During this time, Sufra also began to provide Welfare Surgeries for existing users. Users who already have a food bank voucher or are taking part in any other programme or activity, are able to request additional support from our team of advice workers. The Food Bank states that they do not support every case and that only a limited number of cases are taken on a weekly basis. Generally, they began providing the following; assistance with CVs and job applications, assistance with online benefit forms, guidance on issues relating to benefits, housing or employment and even arranging for specialist help and support.

As of 2021, Sufra run Advice Drop-Ins on Tuesdays and Thursdays from 10am to 4pm during their food bank sessions. Advice Workers offer ongoing face-to-face guidance and support for people in crisis on a range of issues such as benefits, housing and employment. The service is only available to Food Bank guests and runs from The Living Room at St. Raphael’s Estate.

2016–2017: Food Academy Plus & St. Raphael's Edible Garden

Sufra expanded their kitchen in the beginning of 2016, allowing them to provide free, freshly-cooked, sit-down meals, giving a restaurant experience to individuals and families on a weekly basis. The service is open to all members of the community and they encourage members of the public to join them and eat alongside the most disadvantaged in the community, providing informal peer-support and a listening service. 

In April 2016, Sufra held a ”Rich Man, Poor Man” fundraising gala dinner. It was held in Brent Civic Centre and the charity managed to raise £60,000 from the event, the yearly operational costs of the organisation at that time. 

During the summer of 2016, Sufra decided to launch a more sophisticated approach with Food Academy and launched Food Academy Plus. This programme aimed to recruit, train and find employment for 20 adults in the catering industry. Across the programme, participants learned professional cooking skills, project management skills and customer service. There were also compulsory study sessions in numeracy, literacy and ICT, work experience in a professional restaurant at the London Designer Outlet, as well as the support of a mentor and employment coach throughout. The programme included setting up a pop-up restaurant at Sufra NW London, where the charity invited local employers to see the skills of graduates first-hand and recruit new chefs, waiters and restaurant staff. As an incentive, participants received a free chef’s uniform, 3-month bus pass and access to all in-house support and opportunities available at Sufra NW London. That included a discretionary fund, which was used to financially support vulnerable and/or low-income volunteers. 

In November 2016, Sufra was also featured on episode 1 of BBC's The Big Food Rescue. Which followed two men on a mission to change Britain's food habits by rescuing the fresh food that supermarkets used to bin and getting it to the people who need it.

On 1 June 2017, Sufra launched an online store on eBay in an attempt to increase donations and funds. The store sold Sufra branded items such as T-shirts, pen holders and trolley coins.

In 2016, Brent Council approved a growing garden project. The garden project was located just a minute walk away from Sufra's main office and was named St. Raphael’s Edible Garden. The charity officially launched the project in March, 2017 and now runs various accredited gardening courses for children and adults. The garden currently has a yurt, a wildlife pond which has fish and other pond animals and, until 2022, had a chicken coop with over 20 chickens for the production of eggs sold to residents of the estate. The garden also has compost bins, a pizza oven, a greenhouse and a stunning pergola. In 2022, St. Raphael's Edible Garden partnered with Social Farms & Gardens and HelloFresh, becoming their London garden representative.

2018–2019: Faces of Sufra, Mamdani's resignation

On 26 April 2018. Sufra released Faces of Sufra. A book which shows what the stakeholders of Sufra have to say about the organisation. Faces of Sufra NW London celebrated the fifth anniversary of the charity by profiling the people behind the organisation; its staff, volunteers and guests, as well as external supporters, faith leaders and corporate sponsors. Through their pictures and stories, the book reveals the defining characteristics of what it means to give, share and receive. It was compiled Berrun Gur, a graphic designer who specialises in the non-profit sector. In November 2018, the food bank was noticed for stockpiling food before the rollout of Universal Credit. The organisation believed that the scheme will bring ‘hardship and acute stress’ for many of those affected. Other London boroughs that have rolled out Universal Credit, had seen a 52% increase in food banks, so Sufra prepared for this and decided to collect as much food as they can. On 15 January 2019, Mamdani resigned from Sufra as the director and was replaced by Rajesh Makwana, BEM 

In May 2019, the charity hosted a fundraiser in support of Syrian refugees labelled “From Syria, with Love.” The event was held at the Mount Stewart School in Harrow. It was open to all faiths and all people, and involved a screening of the film After Spring, which depicts the lives of those working in Zaatari, the world's biggest camp for Syrian refugees in Jordan. All money raised was directly donated to support refugees and asylum seekers.

During refugee week 2019, Sufra released a short film titled “More than Just a Food Bank”. It was made for the charity by volunteer and professional director, Chris Fowles, with support from the Media Trust and John Lyon’s Charity. It captures the work at Sufra, showing how it helps people of all ages to gain new skills and be part of the solution, by helping themselves and others. In November 2019, Sufra held a "Food-Parcel Challenge" which aimed to shine a light on the current food poverty crisis in Brent where people would have live on a food parcel for five days whilst raising funds for the charity.

2020–2022: Covid-19 and Beyond

Sufra is now the borough’s largest and busiest food aid service, receiving referrals from over 150 organisations. During the pandemic, the demand for emergency aid provided by Sufra surged by 332%. They became a delivery only organisation, distributing over 34,000 food parcels to those who were vulnerable, self-isolating and struggling financially. 

Sufra’s food bank network expanded operations across 3 hubs in Brent: the Pakistan Community Centre in Willesden, the Ansar Youth Project in Wembley (closed as a hub as of 2023) and main Sufra premises. The main premises distribute food parcels on Tuesdays and Thursdays from 11am-3pm, but are open for donations Monday-Friday from 10am-5pm. 

They joined the Feeding Britain network, the Independent Food Aid Network and the Brent Food Aid Network (eventually becoming chair of the latter) – campaigning for Brent to become a Brent Right to Food borough. Playing a pivotal role during the pandemic in supporting Brent Council’s response to food shortages, Sufra supported them to set up their own temporary food aid service.

Sufra also partnered with organisations to produce and distribute Brent’s ‘Cash First’ leaflet, which presents a range of options for accessing more effective forms of support than food aid. Additionally, they pioneered an NHS Emergency Food Pack service, where they work with several NHS departments to provide food packs for vulnerable patients being discharged who have no food at home, which increases the availability of beds and reduces readmissions. 

Sufra was featured in Hello! magazine's list of charities you can support during coronavirus and how to help in 2020. The charity was holding a coronavirus emergency appeal during this time of the year. Sufra struggled with food chain crisis during the pandemic. Rajesh Makwana, the director of Sufra, received a British Empire Medal in 2022 for his services to Brent, particularly during the pandemic.

As of 2022, Sufra NW London operates 3 community kitchens. Their Community Kitchen services are open all year round, serving hundreds of meals every week to hungry guests – including the homeless, families experiencing food poverty and people who are socially isolated and lonely. Guests are served a freshly cooked 2 or 3 course hot meal to anyone who turns up, regardless of their circumstances. Guests can simply come along without prior booking and enjoy great food and company in a welcoming community setting. They also run a delivery service for those who are disabled or unable to cook for themselves. Sufra had partnered with Laurence’s Larder and Granville Community Kitchen in 2020 to run community kitchens, and Ark Elvin Academy in 2022 (with support from the Raheem Sterling Foundation).

In January 2022, Sufra NW London teamed up with Islamic Relief in which Islamic Relief provided Sufra with over £13,000 to help almost 3,000 recipients with winter food packs. Tufail Hussain of Islamic Relief stated "“Sufra NW is doing vital work in the community to help those in need. We are proud to be working with them to deliver much-needed relief to families during these winter months." During Ramadan 2022, it was reported by the BBC that half of UK Muslims will struggle to provide enough food to break fast during Ramadan, a spokesperson for Sufra stated that they expected a pandemic-level crisis.

In 2022, Sufra rebranded their Refugee Resettlement Programme into the OpenARMs programme, supporting asylum seekers, refugees and migrants. By getting referred into the programme, guests receive: 

- Tailored advice to ensure they have access to all eligible entitlements and services available to them. 

- Information about their local area and key locations, GP registration, support with school admissions, NASS applications, Home Office Fee Waivers, benefits and grants applications. 

- Referrals to specialist support services 

- A program of resettlement activities that meet the specific needs of refugee and asylum-seeking families, including conversational English classes, trips and events, mental wellbeing sessions, coffee mornings and more. 

- Guidance on how to organise and contribute to local and national advocacy efforts to promote migrant rights. 

It was during this year that Sufra also started hosting Sufra Supper Clubs to honour the guests on their OpenARMs programme. For each event, they work with a few of the guests to curate a menu, cook the food, arrange the activities and design the night. The Supper Clubs allow the guests to share their culture and the meaning behind the food with Sufra supporters. Sufra have been able to raise thousands of pounds for their core services because of everyone who’s come so far. Their first partnership for the event was with Kieu-my Pham Thai of 9 Kitchens for a Supper Club in honour of Refugee Week in June 2022. The second partnership was with Saima Khan of The Hampstead Kitchen for a Yalda-themed Supper Club during Sufra’s Surviving Winter Appeal in December 2022.

2023–present: Community Wellbeing Project

In 2023, Sufra launched a new 6-month pilot project in partnership with Brent Council at Bridge Park Leisure Centre targeting those in their community who are working families on benefits who still need a bit of support.

They have developed the Community Wellbeing Project – a collaboration designed to provide holistic support to local residents through the cost-of-living crisis.

Based on a 3-month membership model, a weekly membership fee gives members access to weekly shopping worth approximately £25, hot meals, triaging and themed welfare advice, social activities and other forms of wraparound support – all in a warm and friendly community space. This project marked Sufra's first experimentation with a Community Shop and allowed them to reach their goal of having a Community Kitchen service every weekday.

See also

 List of food banks

References

External links

 Sufra NW London  Official Website

Food banks
Charities based in London
Charities based in Brent
Islamic relief organizations